Wolfgang Axel Tomé is a physicist working in Medicine as a researcher; inventor; and educator. He is noted for his contributions to the use of photogrammetry in high precision radiation therapy; his work on risk adaptive radiation therapy which is based on the risk level for recurrence in tumor sub-volumes using biological objective functions; and the development of hippocampal avoidant cranial radiation therapy techniques to alleviate hippocampal-dependent neurocognitive impairment following cranial irradiation.

He is the author of Path Integrals on Group manifolds and the co-author of Dose painting IMRT using Biological Parameters. Together with Anatoly Pinchuk and Jamey Weichert, he is the inventor of long-lived tumor specific Gadolinium based agents for imaging and therapy.  He  has more than 250 published articles in various areas of medical and mathematical physics (cf. PubMed,MATHSCINET), and 7 patents to his credit. In addition, he has been actively involved in a number of AAPM task groups and the AAPM Working group on Biological Effects of Hypofractionated Radiotherapy/SBRT.

In recognition of his distinguished and significant contributions to the fields of medical physics and radiation oncology he has been bestowed the distinction and title of Fellow of the American Association of Physicists in Medicine (FAAPM) in 2010 and Fellow of the American Society for Radiation Oncology (FASTRO) in 2017.

References

External links 
 Wolfgang A. Tome profile at Albert Einstein College of Medicine
 Institute for Onco-Physics 

21st-century American physicists
University of Denver alumni
University of Florida alumni
University of Wisconsin–Madison faculty
Albert Einstein College of Medicine faculty
Year of birth missing (living people)
Living people
Medical physicists
Studienstiftung alumni